"Bad Girl" is a single by British artist, Fugative. It released on 25 July 2010 on digital download on Hard2Beat Records. Celeste Scalone provides vocals on the song's hook, but is uncredited. The track charted at number 59 on the UK Singles Chart.

Track listing

Chart performance

Release history

References

External links
 Official website
 Fugative on Twitter

2010 songs
2010 singles
Fugative songs